Paul Annacone was the defending champion, but lost in the first round to Jaime Yzaga.

John McEnroe won the title by defeating Stefan Edberg 6–2, 6–3 in the final.

Seeds

Draw

Finals

Top half

Bottom half

References

External links
 Official results archive (ATP)
 Official results archive (ITF)

Los Angeles Open (tennis)
1986 Grand Prix (tennis)
Volvo Tennis Los Angeles
Volvo Tennis Los Angeles